Krus or KRUS may refer to:
 Kru people, or Krus, an ethnic group of West Africa
 KRUS, an American radio station
 , the Farmers Social Insurance Fund of Poland
 Marek Kruś (born 1952), Polish hockey player
 Kura Sushi, a Japanese sushi restaurant chain traded under the Nasdaq ticker KRUS

See also 
 Kru (disambiguation)
 Kruz (disambiguation)
 Kruse
 Kroos, a surname
 Kroes, a surname
 Kruss (disambiguation)
 Krusz, a village in Poland
 Crus (disambiguation)